Harps and Angels is the 10th studio album by Randy Newman. It was released on August 5, 2008, and was produced by Mitchell Froom and Lenny Waronker. It contains two updated versions of previously released compositions. “Feels Like Home” originally appeared on his musical album Randy Newman's Faust, and a demo of "Laugh and be Happy" was included in the box set Guilty: 30 Years of Randy Newman.

Reception 

Harps and Angels debuted on the UK Albums Chart at #46. It placed 12th in the 2008 Pazz & Jop Critics Poll, and it made #48 in Q's 50 Best Albums of the Year 2008. The song "A Few Words in Defense of Our Country" was named the sixth best song of the 2000s decade by music critic Robert Christgau.

Track listing
All songs written and arranged by Randy Newman

 "Harps and Angels" - 5:07
 "Losing You" - 2:41
 "Laugh and Be Happy" - 2:17
 "A Few Words in Defense of Our Country" - 4:14
 "A Piece of the Pie" - 2:41
 "Easy Street" - 3:14
 "Korean Parents" - 3:26
 "Only a Girl" - 2:45
 "Potholes" - 3:39
 "Feels Like Home" - 4:37

Musicians
Randy Newman - pianist and bandleader
Greg Cohen - bass
Steve Donnelly - guitar
Pete Thomas - drums
Greg Leisz - pedal steel guitar and acoustic slide guitar
Mitchell Froom - keyboard and organ
Violins: Roger Wilkie (concertmaster), Eun-Mee Ahn, Jacqueline Brand, Kevin Connolly, Joel Derouin, Julie Ann Gigante, Natalie Leggett, Helen Nightengale, Alyssa Park, Sara Parkins, Katia Popov, Rafael Rishik, Anatoly Rosinsky, Marc Sazer, Tereza Stanislav, Lisa M. Sutton, Sarah Thornblade, Irina Voloshina
Violas: Brian Dembow (first viola), Robert Berg, Thomas Diener, Steven Gordon, Roland Kato, Darrin McCann, Victoria Miskolczy, Michael Nowak, Shanti Randall, David Walther
Violoncelli: Dennis Karmazyn (first cello), Antony Cooke, Steve Erdody, Christine Ermacoff, Armen Ksajikian, Andrew Shulman, David Speltz, Cecelia Tsan
Bass violins: Michael Valerio (first bass violin), Drew Dembowski, Edward Meares, Susan Ranney
Flutes: James Walker, Norda Mullen, Geraldine Rotella, David Shostac
Clarinets: Gary Boyver, Stuart Clark, Donald Foster, Marty Krystall
Saxophones: Daniel Higgins, Gary Foster, Greg Huckins, Bill Liston, Brian Scanlon
Oboes: Thomas Boyd, Leslie Reed
Bassoons: Kenneth Munday, Michael O'Donovan, Judith Farmer
French horns: James Thatcher, Mark Adams, Richard Todd
Trumpets: Warren Luening, Malcolm McNab, Daniel Fornero, Jon Lewis, Timothy Morrison
Trombones: William Booth, Bruce Fowler, Alesander Iles, William Reichenbach, George Thatcher
Tuba: Doug Tornquist
Percussion (including mallets): Alan Estes, Gregory Goodall
Harps: Jo Ann Turovsky, Allison Allport
Accordion: Frank Marocco
Background vocals: Carmen Carter, Tim Davis, Luana Jackman, Steve Jackson, Rick Logan, Susan Stevens Logan, Fletcher Sheridan, Oren Waters, Terry Woods

Album credits
Produced by Mitchell Froom and Lenny Waronker
Engineered by David Boucher
Recorded at Sunset Sound Studios in Hollywood and at The Newman Stage, Twentieth Century Fox Studios in Beverly Hills
Mixed at Tea Time Studios in Santa Monica
Mastered by Robert C. Ludwig at Gateway Mastering Studios in Portland, Maine
Randy Newman's personal manager: Cathy Kerr Management, Inc. of Los Angeles
Angry Belgians on "A Piece of the Pie": Kathie Van Kerckhoven and Jeremy Altervain
Happy immigrants on "Laugh and Be Happy": Los Amigos Locos del Este
Orchestral contractor: Sandy DeCrescent
Music preparation: Jo Ann Kane Music Services
Vocal contractor: Luana Jackman
Album photography: Autumn De Wilde
Stock photography for booklet by Jupiterimages (page 8), Perry Mastrovito (outside inlay), and Photo 24 (inside inlay)
Art direction and design: Barbara De Wilde
Production manager for Nonesuch Records: Eli Cane
Editorial coordinator for Nonesuch Records: Ronen Givony
Executive in charge of production for Nonesuch Records: Karina Beznicki
Executive producer: Robert Hurwitz

References

Randy Newman albums
2008 albums
Albums produced by Mitchell Froom
Albums produced by Lenny Waronker
Nonesuch Records albums
Albums recorded at Sunset Sound Recorders